Romário Augusto Vieira Nan (born 19 July 1998) is a professional footballer who plays as a midfielder for Tadcaster Albion. He was born in Guinea-Bissau and also holds Portuguese and English nationality.

Club career

Early career
Vieira was raised in Portugal with his twin brother Ronaldo Vieira. He left Portugal in 2011 in search of more job opportunities for his family in England. Vieira began playing football in England with his brother for Whitley Bay Boys Club, a local team near Newcastle. Vieira then moved to Yorkshire and played two seasons in the Huddersfield Junior Football league for Batley Phoenix.

Vieira then signed for York-based i2i Football Academy whilst studying at York College. He signed for Northern Premier League side Tadcaster Albion joining their academy. He went on trial at a side in the Czech First League and looked set to sign before interest from Leeds.

Leeds United
On 1 September 2016, he joined Leeds United on a one-year deal from Tadcaster Albion, joining his brother Ronaldo Vieira who was already a first team player at Leeds having made his debut in 2016. With Romario set to link up initially with the Under 23 side.

After impressing for Leeds Under 23s side. On 31 January 2018, Vieira was named on the substitutes' bench for Leeds for the first time against Hull City in Leeds' 0–0 draw, in the process Ronaldo and Vieira became the third set of brothers to ever feature in a match day squad for Leeds United after Eddie and Frank Gray, and Ray and Rod Wallace He was again named on the bench in the following game, this time in a 1-4 loss against Cardiff City, the match proved to be the last of then head coach Thomas Christiansen who was sacked after the game.

On 18 May 2018, in Leeds' retained list for the 2018–19 season, Leeds announced they would not be renewing Vieira's contract and he would be released upon expiry.

Trial spells
In July 2018, Vieira joined EFL League One side Doncaster Rovers on trial and was named as a trialist amongst their substitutes bench in a pre-season friendly against Grimsby Town where he played as a substitute. He scored for Doncaster in their pre season friendly against Deeping Rangers. 

After failing to negotiate a deal at Doncaster, Vieira held unsuccessful trials at sides Bradford City and Notts County.

He had a trial with Gateshead in summer 2020.

Tadcaster Albion
After two years as a free agent, Vieira signed for former youth club and Northern Premier League Division One North West side Tadcaster Albion in October 2020, and made his debut for them on 24 October 2020 in a 2–1 defeat at home to Ramsbottom United.

International career
Vieira was eligible to represent Guinea-Bissau, Portugal or England having been educated in the country for five years before the age of 18.

After deciding to represent Guinea-Bissau at international level, he was called up to the national team. On 22 March 2018, Vieira made his debut against Burkina Faso as a substitute in a 2–0 loss.

Personal life
Vieira moved to Portugal at the age of five, shortly after the death of his father.

Vieira was named after Brazilian footballer Romário, with his twin brother Ronaldo Vieira named after Brazilian footballer Ronaldo. Ronaldo is also a footballer and plays at Sampdoria.

His twin brother Ronaldo represents the England U21s after he decided to represent England.

References

External links
Leeds United profile

Tadcaster Albion profile

1998 births
Living people
Sportspeople from Bissau
Bissau-Guinean footballers
Guinea-Bissau international footballers
English footballers
Portuguese footballers
Association football midfielders
Leeds United F.C. players
Tadcaster Albion A.F.C. players
English Football League players
Northern Premier League players
English people of Bissau-Guinean descent
English people of Portuguese descent
Portuguese sportspeople of Bissau-Guinean descent
Expatriate footballers in England